Hans Hoffmann (born 2 December 1919) was an SS-Rottenführer and member of staff at Auschwitz concentration camp. He was prosecuted at the Auschwitz Trial.

Born in India, Hoffmann was a German national with Yugoslavian citizenship. He worked as a locksmith. Following the invasion by Nazi forces, Hoffmann was drafted into the Yugloslavian army, and was taken prisoner by Germany. He joined the SS on October 21, 1942, and was deployed to Auschwitz, where he initially worked as a guard. Later he was assigned to the Politische Abteilung (camp Gestapo) in the main camp. In October 1944, he was deployed to Birkenau, where he worked as an interrogator.

Hoffmann was tried by the Supreme National Tribunal at the Auschwitz Trial in Kraków for his role at the camp, and was sentenced to 15 years in prison. Due to an amnesty, he was released on 14 July 1956.

Bibliography 
 Cyprian T., Sawicki J., Siedem wyroków Najwyższego Trybunału Narodowego, Poznań 1962

1919 births
Possibly living people
People convicted in the Auschwitz trial
Gestapo personnel
Nazis from outside Germany
Immigrants to Yugoslavia
Yugoslav emigrants to Germany